William of Rubruck was a Flemish Franciscan missionary and explorer.

He is best known for his travels to various parts of the Middle East and Central Asia in the 13th century, including the Mongol Empire. His account of his travels is one of the masterpieces of medieval travel literature, comparable to those of Marco Polo and Ibn Battuta.

Mission

William was born in Rubrouck, Flanders. In 1248, he accompanied King Louis IX of France on the Seventh Crusade. On 7 May 1253, on Louis' orders, he set out on a missionary journey to convert the Tatars to Christianity. He first stopped in Constantinople to confer with Baldwin of Hainaut, who had recently returned from a trip to Karakorum, the capital of the Mongol Empire, on behalf of Baldwin II, Latin Emperor. There, William received letters to some of the Tatar chiefs from the emperor.

William then followed the route of the first journey of the Hungarian Friar Julian, and in Asia that of the Italian Friar Giovanni da Pian del Carpine. With William's party were Bartolomeo da Cremona, an attendant called Gosset, and an interpreter named in William's report as Homo Dei, meaning "man of God", perhaps representing the Arabic Abdullah, "servant of God".  William's was the fourth European mission to the Mongols: previous ones had been led by Giovanni da Pian del Carpine and Ascelin of Lombardia in 1245 and André de Longjumeau in 1249. The King had been encouraged to send another mission by reports of the presence of Nestorian Christians at the Mongolian court, but because of an earlier rebuff he declined to send a formal mission.

Travels
After reaching the Crimean town of Sudak, William continued his trek with oxen and carts. Nine days after crossing the Don, he met Sartaq Khan, ruler of the Kipchak Khanate. The Khan sent William on to his father, Batu Khan, at Sarai near the Volga River. Five weeks later, after the departure from Sudak, he reached the encampment of Batu Khan, Mongol ruler of the Volga River region. Batu refused conversion but sent the ambassadors on to the Great Khan of the Mongols, Möngke Khan.

William and his travelling companions set off on horseback on 16 September 1253 on a  journey to the court of the Great Khan at Karakorum. Arriving in late December they were received courteously, and he was given an audience on 4 January 1254. William's account provided an extensive description of the city's walls, markets and temples, and the separate quarters for Muslim and Chinese craftsmen among a surprisingly cosmopolitan population. He also visited the court of the Vastacius (Empire of Nicaea) during the feast day of Felicitas and met Nicaean envoys during his travels. Among the Europeans he encountered were the nephew of an English bishop, a woman from Lorraine who cooked William's Easter dinner, and a French silversmith who was making ornaments for the Khan's women and altars for the Nestorian Christians. Guillaume Boucher was the Frenchman.

William's party stayed at the Khan's camp until 10 July 1254, when they began their long journey back home. After spending two weeks in late September with Batu Khan, and Christmas at Nakhchivan in present-day Azerbaijan, he and his companions reached the County of Tripoli on 15 August 1255.

Account

On his return, William presented to King Louis IX a very clear and precise report, entitled . William's report is divided into 40 chapters. Chapters 1–10 relate general observations about the Mongols and their customs, while chapters 11–40 give an account of the course and the events of William's voyage.

In the report, he described the peculiarities of the Mongol Empire as well as many geographical observations. There were also anthropological observations, such as his surprise at the presence of Islam in Inner Asia. William was critical of the Hellenic traditions he encountered among the Christians of the former Byzantine Empire, including the Nicaean celebration of a feast day for Felicitas, which he reports was known to John III Doukas Vatatzes through the alleged possession of the second half of Ovid's incomplete Book of Days.

William also answered a long-standing question in demonstrating by his passage north of the Caspian Sea that it was an inland sea and did not flow into the Arctic Ocean; although earlier Scandinavian explorers like Ingvar the Far-Travelled had extensive knowledge of the region, William was the first to answer the question in written form.

William's report is one of the great masterpieces of medieval geographical literature, comparable to that of Marco Polo, although they are very different. William was a good observer and an excellent writer. He asked many questions along the way and did not take folk tales and fables as literal truth. He showed a great facility with language, noting the similarities between those he encountered and those European languages he already knew.

In May 1254, during his stay among the Mongols, William entered into a famous competition at the Mongol court, as the khan encouraged a formal theological debate between the Christians, Buddhists, and Muslims, in order to determine which faith was correct, as determined by three judges, one from each faith. A Chinese person participated with William in the competition.

Roger Bacon, William's contemporary and fellow-Franciscan, cited the traveller copiously in his Opus Majus, and described him as "Brother William through whom the lord King of France sent a message to the Tartars in 1253 AD...who traveled to regions in the east and north and attached himself to the midst of these places, and wrote of the above to the illustrious king; which book I carefully read and with his permission expounded on". After Bacon, however, William's narrative seems to have dropped out of sight until Richard Hakluyt's 1599 publication.

Russian poet Nikolay Zabolotskiy wrote in 1958 long poem "Rubruck in Mongolia" ("Рубрук в Монголии").

Editions
The Latin text of an incomplete manuscript containing only the first 26 chapters, together with an English translation by Richard Hakluyt, was published in 1599. A critical edition of the complete Latin text prepared by the French historian Francisque Michel and the English antiquarian Thomas Wright was published in 1839. An English translation by William Woodville Rockhill, The Journey of William of Rubruk to the Eastern Parts, was published by the Hakluyt Society in 1900, and an updated translation by Peter Jackson in 1990.

List of manuscripts

See also
Chronology of European exploration of Asia
Michał Boym
Benedict of Poland

Notes

References

Sources

 Based on British Library MS Royal 14.C.XIII Fol. 225r-236r and thus ends prematurely.

 A critical edition of the Latin text on pp. 213–396.

Further reading

External links

Rubrouck Museum.
Map of Rubruck's Route, Silk Road Seattle, University of Washington.
William of Rubruck's Account of the Mongols, Silk Road Seattle, University of Washington. From the 1900 Rockhill translation.

1220s births
1290s deaths
People from Nord (French department)
13th-century explorers
13th-century Latin writers
Roman Catholic missionaries in Mongolia
Diplomats of the Holy See
Explorers of Asia
Flemish Franciscans
Christians of the Sixth Crusade
Christians of the Seventh Crusade
Franciscan missionaries
Belgian Roman Catholic missionaries